Regulation (EU) 2019/1020 is a regulation of the European Union on market surveillance and compliance of products.

The Regulation had the effect of amending Directive 2004/42/EC and Regulations (EC) No 765/2008 and (EU) No 305/2011. Provision has been made for operational cooperation between UK and EU market surveillance authorities within the proposed EU–UK Trade and Cooperation Agreement of 2020.

The regulation aims to protect customers’ health and safety, the environment and other public interests.

References

External links 
 

European Union regulations